Lea Ghirardi a.k.a. Lea Ghirardi-Rubbi (born 10 February 1974) is a former French tennis player.

Ghirardi, whose career peaked in the 1990s, was once ranked 73rd in the world.

ITF finals

Singles (6–3)

Doubles (3–4)

References

External links

 
 

Living people
French female tennis players
Place of birth missing (living people)
1974 births
Mediterranean Games silver medalists for France
Mediterranean Games bronze medalists for France
Mediterranean Games medalists in tennis
Competitors at the 1993 Mediterranean Games
Sportspeople from Colombes